Alun Thomas (1926–1991) was a Welsh rugby union player.

Alun Thomas may also refer to:

Alun Thomas, musician in The Leg, a Scottish rock band
Alun Thomas, headmaster at the Britannica International School Shanghai

See also
Alan Thomas (disambiguation)